Upper Queensbury is a settlement in New Brunswick at the intersection of Route 105 and the southern terminus of Route 610 on the north bank of the  Saint John River.

History

Notable people

See also
List of communities in New Brunswick

References

Communities in York County, New Brunswick